David Dobkin (born 23 June 1969) is an American director, producer and screenwriter. He is best known for directing the films Clay Pigeons, Shanghai Knights, Wedding Crashers, The Judge, and Eurovision Song Contest: The Story of Fire Saga.

Early life
Dobkin was born and raised on 23 June 1969 in Washington, D.C., where he attended Lafayette Elementary School,  and later was raised in the suburb of Bethesda, Maryland, where he attended Walt Whitman High School.

Career
Dobkin made his music-video debut with a video clips for rapper Tupac Shakur. Fifteen more videos followed for such music groups as Extreme, Robin Zander, Sonic Youth, dada, Blues Traveler, and others. Dobkin's music-video credits include George Thorogood's "One Bourbon, One Scotch, One Beer," Elton John's "You Can Make History", and Coolio's "1, 2, 3, 4". Dobkin also collaborated with band Maroon 5 in their music videos "Sugar", "Don't Wanna Know", "Memories", "Nobody's Love" and "Girls Like You" and an upcoming documentary film. As of 2021, no word when the film will be released.

After shooting television commercials, Dobkin broke into feature films with Clay Pigeons, for Scott Free, the first film produced at Ridley and Tony Scott's production company that they did not direct. The black comedy about a series of small-town murders starred Vince Vaughn, Joaquin Phoenix and Janeane Garofalo, and was distributed by Gramercy Pictures. Dobkin next directed the comedies Shanghai Knights (2003), starring Jackie Chan and Owen Wilson, and Wedding Crashers (2005), with Wilson and Vaughn.

Through his production company Big Kid Pictures, Dobkin both produced and directed Fred Claus (2007), starring Vaughn and Paul Giamatti, and The Change-Up (2011), starring Ryan Reynolds and Jason Bateman. He co-wrote and was an executive producer of the film adaption of Dark Horse Comics' R.I.P.D. (2013), Dobkin directed 2014's The Judge, starring Robert Downey Jr. and Robert Duvall.

Filmography

Films 

As himself
 Lennon or McCartney (2014) 
 Here's to Life: The Story of the Refreshments (2017)

Television

Music videos

Commercials 
Dobkin has directed commercials for clients such as ESPN, Heineken (which earned him honors from SHOOT magazine), Carl's Jr., Coke, Honda, Coors Light and Sony PlayStation (which won a Bronze Lion at Cannes). His spots for the Utah Symphony were named "Spot of the Month" by Adweek Magazine and featured as the year's best in Communication Arts Magazine.

References

External links
 
David Dobkin at RSA Films.

American male screenwriters
Living people
American music video directors
American film producers
Tisch School of the Arts alumni
English-language film directors
Film directors from Washington, D.C.
Screenwriters from Washington, D.C.
Television commercial directors
Year of birth missing (living people)
Comedy film directors
Walt Whitman High School (Maryland) alumni